Kotorr (in Albanian)  is a village in Kosovo located in the town-municipality of Skenderaj and in the District of Mitrovica. According to the 2011 census, it had 279 inhabitants, all of whom were Albanian.

Geography 

The village is located on the north side of the Pec-Mitrovica road, some 8 kilometres north-west of Skenderaj/Srbica.

History 
The village was mentioned in the 1455 Ottoman defter (tax registry) of the conquered lands of Gjergj Kastrioti Skenderbeu. The village had an old church, of which only micro-toponyms exist today: "Church" ( Kisha), and "Church Valley" (Lugu i Kishës).

After the Kosovo War, during the presence of the NATO-led peacekeeping Kosovo Force, two houses belonging to Serbs were burnt down and one house was illegally occupied.

Demographics

Notes

References

Villages in Skenderaj
Medieval Serbian sites in Kosovo
Drenica